Jack Bay State Marine Park is a 1,544 acre (625 ha) state park in the U.S. state of Alaska near Valdez. The park covers 811 acres and is nestled in Jack Bay, about an hour's boat ride from Valdez. The park is surrounded by steep mountains and a spruce-hemlock forest. There is no road access to the park; the park is only accessible by boat or plane. Popular activities include camping, fishing, kayaking, and wildlife viewing. 

The park consists of alder, muskeg, salt marsh and old growth forest of spruce and hemlock.

The park has a 12x14 rustic cabin that sleeps six.

See also 

 List of Alaska state parks

References

External links 
 U.S. Geological Survey Map at the U.S. Geological Survey Map Website. Retrieved March 20, 2022.
 http://dnr.alaska.gov/parks/aspunits/kenai/jackbaysmp.htm
 

State parks of Alaska
National Wildlife Refuges in Alaska

